Tessa McWatt FRSL is a Guyanese-born Canadian writer.  She has written seven novels and is a creative writing professor at the University of East Anglia in Norwich, United Kingdom. In 2021 she was elected as a Fellow of the Royal Society of Literature.

Early life 
McWatt was born in Georgetown, Guyana, and moved to Canada with her family when she was three years old.  She was raised in Toronto, where her family embraced the Canadian outdoors through camping, skiing, and canoeing.  As a child, McWatt was interested in music, sports, and literature.  Even as a child she knew she wanted to be a writer.

Education 
McWatt studied English literature at Queen's University and then earned her MA at the University of Toronto.  Her MA focused on post-colonial literature and explored subject matter like how outsiders are perceived within society and how there are conflicting ideas regarding belonging.

Career 
After university, she found employment as an editor and college instructor, while living in Montreal, Paris, and Ottawa. In 1999, McWatt moved to London, England, where she taught creative writing and wrote. She is presently Professor of Creative Writing at the University of East Anglia (UEA), UK.

She is the author of novels, stories, essays and libretto, along with There's No Place Like... (2004) a novella for young adults. Her first novel was Out of My Skin, the story of an adopted Canadian woman seeking her roots (1998; second edition Cormorant Books, 2012). Her second novel, Dragons Cry (2001), was shortlisted for the City of Toronto Book Awards and the Canadian Governor General's Literary Awards. Her other novels include This Body (HarperCollins, 2004, and Macmillan Caribbean, 2005), Step Closer (HarperCollins 2009), Vital Signs (Random House Canada 2011 and William Heinemann, 2012), which was nominated for the 2012 OCM Bocas Prize for Caribbean Literature, Higher Ed (Random House Canada and Scribe UK, 2015) and The Snow Line (Random House Canada and Scribe UK, 2021), nominated for the Gordon Bowker Volcano Prize. 

McWatt provided the libretto for Hannah Kendall's opera The Knife of Dawn, based on the incarceration of political activist Martin Carter in the then British Guiana in 1953.

She is the co-editor, along with Dionne Brand and Rabindranath Maharaj, of Luminous Ink: Writers on Writing in Canada (Cormorant Books, 2018). She was one of the winners of the Eccles British Library Award 2018 for her critical memoir Shame on Me: An Anatomy of Race and Belonging, which was also shortlisted for the 2020 Hilary Weston Writers' Trust Prize for Nonfiction, the 2020 Canadian Governor General's Literary Awards for Non-Fiction, and it was the Non-Fiction Winner of the 2020 OCM Bocas Prize for Caribbean Literature.

Bibliography

Books

Essays and reporting

References

Sources
 Beckford, Sharon Morgan. Naturally Woman: The Search for Self in Black Canadian Women's Literature. Toronto: Inanna, 2011. [Chapter 4 provides a reading of McWatt's Out of My Skin as a fiction about the issues of individuation that black female characters face as immigrants to Canada.]
 Lacombe, Michèle. "Embodying the Glocal. Immigrant and Indigenous Ideas of Home in Tessa McWatt's Montreal." In Ana María Fraile-Marcos, ed., Literature and the Glocal City. London: Routledge, 2014. 39–54. [Lacombe analyses the writer's account of the Oka crisis in Out of My Skin and the main character's problematic reliance on Indigenous spirituality.]

External links
 
 Rosenthal, Caroline. "Embodying the City: Tessa McWatt's This Body and Out of My Skin". Canada and Beyond 4. 1–2 (2014): 23–40. [Rosenthal reads McWatt's treatment of the body in connection to urban space and describes embodied practices.]

Year of birth missing (living people)
Living people
21st-century Canadian novelists
21st-century Canadian women writers
Afro-Guyanese people
Black Canadian women
Canadian women novelists
Canadian expatriates in England
Guyanese expatriates in England
Guyanese emigrants to Canada
New Statesman people
People from Georgetown, Guyana